The 2012 Louisiana Tech Bulldogs football team represented Louisiana Tech University as a member of the Western Athletic Conference (WAC) during the 2012 NCAA Division I FBS football season. Led by third-year head coach Sonny Dykes, the Bulldogs played five of their six home games at Joe Aillet Stadium in Ruston, Louisiana and one at Independence Stadium in Shreveport, Louisiana.  The Bulldogs finished the season 9–3 overall and 4–2 in conference play to  place third in the WAC. Despite having one of the most successful seasons in program history, the Bulldogs did not play in a bowl game. They were initially invited to the Independence Bowl, but asked for more time to decide to see if other options opened up. No other bowl invited them, and the Independence Bowl selected Ohio instead.

This was the Bulldogs last season as members of the WAC as they joined Conference USA in 2013.

Before the season

Recruiting
Four student-athletes in Louisiana Tech's 2012 signing class were already enrolled at Tech prior to signing day. After signing with Louisiana Tech on National Signing Day in 2011, running back Tevin King was finally declared eligible by the NCAA after waiting out the 2011 season, and his scholarship will count towards Tech's 2012 signing class. On November 24, 2011, Sonny Dykes announced that four walk-on players would be receiving football scholarships which count towards the 2012 signing class. These players earning football scholarships include wide receiver D.J. Banks, defensive back Craig Johnson, running back Hunter Lee, and wide receiver Hayden Slack.

Death of Tyrone Duplessis
Early on the morning of February 2, 2012, Louisiana Tech redshirt sophomore running back Tyrone Duplessis awoke in distress at his off-campus apartment in Ruston, Louisiana. He reportedly sprung to a seated position in bed, pounded himself in the chest, and fell backward, never to rise again. He arrived at Northern Louisiana Medical Center before 5:00 a.m. and was pronounced dead shortly thereafter. The autopsy report showed Duplessis suffered a massive heart attack. Toxicology reports came back negative with no drugs or alcohol found.  On February 10, approximately 1,000 people celebrated the life of Duplessis at a memorial service at the Thomas Assembly Center on the Louisiana Tech University campus. The funeral was held on February 11 at the L. B. Landry High School auditorium in New Orleans. The Tyrone Duplessis Memorial Fund was established with the Louisiana Tech Foundation.

T–Day spring game

Sources:

The T–Day spring game was held at Joe Aillet Stadium on April 14, 2012.

Rankings

*Source: ESPN.com: 2012 NCAA Football Rankings

Schedule

Game summaries

at Houston

Sources:

Rice

Sources:

Quarterback Colby Cameron was named WAC Offensive Player of the Week (Week 3) for his performance against Rice.

at Illinois

Sources:

Linebacker Antonio Mitchum was named WAC Defensive Player of the Week (Week 4) for his performance against Illinois. Wide receiver Quinton Patton was awarded an ESPN helmet sticker for his performance Week 4 against Illinois. Colby Cameron was named the Manning Star of the Week for his performance in Week 4.

at Virginia

Sources:

Placekicker Matt Nelson was named WAC Special Teams Player of the Week (Week 5) for his performance against Virginia.

UNLV

Sources:

Running back Kenneth Dixon was named WAC Offensive Player of the Week (Week 6) for his performance against UNLV.

Texas A&M

Sources:

This game was originally scheduled for August 30 at Independence Stadium in Shreveport, Louisiana. However, the game was postponed until October 13 due to Hurricane Isaac.

Wide receiver Quinton Patton was named WAC Offensive Player of the Week (Week 7) for his performance against Texas A&M. Colby Cameron was nominated for the Manning Star of the Week for his performance in Week 7.

Idaho

Sources:

Running back Kenneth Dixon was named the WAC Offensive Player of the Week (Week 8) for his performance against Idaho.

at New Mexico State

Sources:

Punter Ryan Allen was named WAC Special Teams Player of the Week (Week 9) for his performance against New Mexico State.

UTSA

Sources:

Punter Ryan Allen was named WAC Special Teams Player of the Week (Week 10) for his performance against UTSA. Colby Cameron was nominated for the Manning Star of the Week for his performance in Week 10.

at Texas State

Sources:

Running back Kenneth Dixon was named WAC Offensive Player of the Week (Week 11) for his performance against Texas State. Colby Cameron was nominated for the Manning Star of the Week for his performance in Week 11.

Utah State

Sources:

Kick returner D.J. Banks was named WAC Special Teams Player of the Week (Week 12) for his performance against Utah State.

at San Jose State

Sources:

Statistics

Louisiana Tech ranked 1st in the nation in scoring offense (51.5 points per game), total offense (577.92 yards per game), and net punting (43.51 yards per punt). Individually, Kenneth Dixon ranked led the nation in scoring average (14.0 points per game), and Ryan Allen led the nation in punting average (48.04 yards per punt).

After the season

Bowl invitation controversy
On Friday, November 30, Louisiana Tech was invited to play in the Independence Bowl, but asked for more time as they were in negotiations with the Liberty Bowl and Heart of Dallas Bowl. Louisiana Tech athletic director Bruce Van De Velde and WAC commissioner Jeff Hurd claimed that on December 1, Liberty Bowl executive director Steve Ehrhart guaranteed the Bulldogs a bowl invite.  The Independence Bowl offered Louisiana Tech again on Saturday, December 1. After receiving no response, bowl organizers invited the Ohio Bobcats instead. On December 2, the Liberty Bowl extended their remaining bid to Iowa State Cyclones instead of Louisiana Tech. As a result, Louisiana Tech did not play in any of the 2012–13 NCAA football bowl games. The school's administration blamed bowl officials for the situation, which attracted national attention and controversy.

Awards and honors

Two Bulldogs were honored with prestigious national awards. Ryan Allen won the 2012 Ray Guy Award honoring the nation's best punter to become the first student-athlete to win the award in consecutive years. Colby Cameron won the 2012 Sammy Baugh Trophy honoring the nation's top collegiate passer. Bulldogs were named semifinalists for three national awards including Colby Cameron for the Davey O'Brien Award, Quinton Patton for the Fred Biletnikoff Award, and Matt Nelson for the William V. Campbell Trophy.

For their individual performances during the regular season, several Bulldogs were named to various national All-America Teams. Ryan Allen was named to numerous All-America teams including the Associated Press (AP) All-America First Team, American Football Coaches Association (AFCA) All-America First Team, Football Writers Association of America (FWAA) All-America First Team, Sporting News (TSN) All-America First Team, Walter Camp All-America First Team (WCFF) All-America First Team, CBS Sports All-America First Team, ESPN All-America First Team, Pro Football Weekly (PFW) All-America First Team, and Sports Illustrated (SI) All-America First Team. The NCAA recognizes five All-America lists in the determination of unanimous All-America selections: the AP, AFCA, the FWAA, TSN and the WCFF. Unanimous selections must be selected as first team in all five lists. As such, for the 2012 season, Ryan Allen was named a unanimous All-American. Quinton Patton was named to several All-America teams including the AP All-America Second Team, CBS Sports All-America Second Team, SI All-America Second Team, and PFW All-America Honorable Mention Team. Colby Cameron was named to the SI All-America Honorable Mention Team. Kenneth Dixon was recognized with All-America honors including being named to the FWAA Freshman All-America First Team, CBS Sports Freshman All-America First Team, and College Football News (CFN) Freshman All-America First Team.

The WAC recognized a number of Bulldogs for their individual performances with various honors. Colby Cameron was named WAC Offensive Player of the Year, and Kenneth Dixon was named WAC Freshman of the Year. All-WAC First Team selections from Louisiana Tech included Ryan Allen, D.J. Banks, Colby Cameron, Dave Clark, Kenneth Dixon, I.K. Enemkpali, Jordan Mills, Quinton Patton, and Stephen Warner. All-WAC Second Team selections from Louisiana Tech included Chad Boyd, Ray Holley, Oscar Johnson, Kevin Saia, and Myles White.

The Louisiana Sports Writers Association (LSWA) decorated several Bulldogs with postseason honors. Colby Cameron was named LSWA Offensive Player of the Year, and Kenneth Dixon was named LSWA Louisiana Freshman of the Year. LSWA All-Louisiana First Team selections from Louisiana Tech included Ryan Allen, D.J. Banks, Colby Cameron, Kenneth Dixon, I.K. Enemkpali, Oscar Johnson, Quinton Patton, and Stephen Warner.

Several Louisiana Tech players were selected to participate in postseason all-star games. Three Bulldogs including Ryan Allen, Jordan Mills, and Quinton Patton accepted invitations to play in the 2013 Senior Bowl. Colby Cameron competed in the 2013 East–West Shrine Game. Ray Holley and Myles White played in the Casino del Sol College All-Star Game, and Holley's performance earned him the game's Offensive MVP award. Three Bulldogs including Kevin Saia, Stephen Warner, and Myles White participated in the NFLPA Collegiate Bowl. Jordan Mills was also invited to play in the Raycom College Football All-Star Classic.

In addition to their on-field accomplishments, many Bulldogs were recognized for their performance off the gridiron. Ray Holley and Stephen Warner were named to the Capital One Academic All-District First Team, and subsequently Ray Holley was honored even further by being named to the Capital One Academic All-America First Team. Academic All-WAC honorees include Josh Cuthbert, Ray Holley, Matt Nelson, Solomon Randle, Chandler Spence, Andre Taylor, and Stephen Warner. Chandler Spence was also honored with the 1A FAR Academic Excellence Award.

At the team banquet, several Bulldogs were honored with team awards. Colby Cameron was named the Terry Bradshaw Offensive Player of the Year, and I.K. Enemkpali was named the Fred Dean Defensive Player of the Year. Ryan Allen was recognized as the Matt Stover Special Teams Player of the Year. Stephen Warner was named the Willie Roaf Lineman of the Year, and Chad Boyd was given the Tramon Williams Defensive Back of the Year award. David Gru was honored with the Karl Malone Strength and Conditioning Award. Kendrick James and Rufus Porter were both honored with the Most Inspirational Award. Ray Holley was given the Dan Reneau Academic Award, and D.J. Banks was honored with the Davison Family Community Service Award.

A couple Louisiana Tech assistant coaches were nominated for national awards. Offensive coordinator Tony Franklin was nominated for the Broyles Award, an honor bestowed upon the nation's top assistant coach. Franklin was also one of four finalists for the FootballScoop Offensive Coordinator of the Year. Assistant coach Pierre Ingram was one of five finalists for the FootballScoop Running Backs Coach of the Year.

Coaching changes
On December 5, 2012, head coach Sonny Dykes was announced as the new head football coach at the University of California, Berkeley to replace recently fired Jeff Tedford. Offensive coordinator Tony Franklin, assistant head coach/outside receivers coach Rob Likens, special teams/inside receivers coach Mark Tommerdahl, running backs coach Pierre Ingram, and head strength and conditioning coach Damon Harrington were hired by Dykes at California. Cornerbacks coach Kevin Curtis was hired by Texas Tech. Offensive line coach Petey Perot was hired by Southern Miss. Defensive coordinator Tommy Spangler was hired by Presbyterian. On December 13, 2012, former South Florida head coach Skip Holtz accepted an offer to become the new head football coach at Louisiana Tech to replace Dykes. Holtz retained defensive line coach Stan Eggen and linebackers coach Jeff Koonz.

NFL Draft

In February 2013, five Louisiana Tech Bulldogs were invited to the NFL Scouting Combine including Ryan Allen, Colby Cameron, Oscar Johnson, Jordan Mills, and Quinton Patton. At Louisiana Tech's Pro Day on March 26, twenty-four seniors worked out in front of scouts from twenty-three NFL teams. In April's 2013 NFL Draft, Quinton Patton was selected by the San Francisco 49ers in the fourth round, and Jordan Mills was selected by the Chicago Bears in the fifth round. Following the draft, undrafted free agent signees from the 2013 squad were Ryan Allen (New England Patriots), Colby Cameron (Carolina Panthers), Myles White (Green Bay Packers), Ray Holley (Baltimore Ravens), Oscar Johnson (Tennessee Titans), and Kevin Saia (St. Louis Rams).

Roster

References

Louisiana Tech
Louisiana Tech Bulldogs football seasons
Louisiana Tech Bulldogs football